General elections were held in Mozambique in 1977. They were the first elections after independence from Portugal, and FRELIMO was the sole legal party. 

Direct elections were only held for local and city councils, starting on 25 September. These councils then elected members of their local councils to the District Assemblies, which in turn elected representatives to the Provincial Assemblies. FRELIMO produced a single list of shortlisted candidates for the newly created 210-seat People's Assembly, the country's top legislative body. The candidate list was unanimously adopted by the Provincial Assemblies at their first session.

References

1977 in Mozambique
Presidential elections in Mozambique
Elections in Mozambique
Mozambique
One-party elections
September 1977 events in Africa